Hugh Wakefield (10 November 1888 – 5 December 1971) was an English film actor, who played supporting roles. He was often seen wearing a monocle.

Hugh Claude Wakefield was born in Wanstead, Essex. He also had a distinguished stage career, which began at the age of 11. City of Song (1931) was his first film. After completing 1954's The Million Pound Note, Wakefield retired from film acting. He died 5 December 1971 in London aged 83.

Stage
Wakefield appeared in the original London productions of Between Friends (1930), Take a Chance (1931), Tea for Two (1938), Off the Record (1947), Top Secret (1949) and The Remarkable Mr. Pennypacker (1955) .

Personal life

Hugh Wakefield served with the RAF during World War II, along with his Blithe Spirit co-star Rex Harrison. He was also an avid sportsman, particularly enjoying golf and tennis.
His daughter, Margaret Diana (1933-2015), married the aristocratic jockey Gay Kindersley.

Selected filmography

 City of Song (1931) - Hon. Roddy Fielding
 The Sport of Kings (1931) - Algernon Sprigg
 The Man They Couldn't Arrest (1931) - John Dain
 Life Goes On (1932) - Ridgeway Emsworth
 Aren't We All? (1932) - Lord Grenham
 The Crime at Blossoms (1933) - Chris Merryman
 King of the Ritz (1933) - King of Blitz
 The Fortunate Fool (1933) - Jim Falconer
 The Luck of a Sailor (1934) - King Karl
 Lady in Danger (1934) - King
 The Man Who Knew Too Much (1934) - Clive
 My Heart is Calling (1935) - Armand Arvelle
 18 Minutes (1935) - Lord Pilcott
 No Monkey Business (1935) - Prof. Barrington
 Marry the Girl (1935) - Hugh Delafield
 The Improper Duchess (1936) - King of Poldavia
 The Crimson Circle (1936) - Derek Yale
 Forget Me Not (1936) - Mr. Jackson
 The Interrupted Honeymoon (1936) - Uncle John
 Dreams Come True (1936) - Albert von Waldenau
 The Limping Man (1936) - Col. Paget
 It's You I Want (1936) - Otto Gilbert
 The Street Singer (1937) - Hugh Newman
 Death Croons the Blues (1937) - Jim Martin
 The Live Wire (1937) - Grantham
 Runaway Ladies (1938) - Lord Ramsden
 Make It Three (1938) - Percy Higgin
 This England (1941) - Vicar
 Blithe Spirit (1945) - Dr. George Bradman
 Journey Together (1945) - Acting Lieutenant
 One Night With You (1948) - Santell
 No Highway in the Sky (1951) - Sir David Moon, Airline President (uncredited)
 Love's a Luxury (1952) - Charles Pentwick
 The Million Pound Note (1954) - Duke of Cromarty

References

External links
 

1888 births
1971 deaths
English male stage actors
English male film actors
English male television actors
People from Wanstead
20th-century English male actors
Royal Air Force personnel of World War II